McDonough is a small unincorporated community in New Castle County, Delaware, United States.  The community lies north of Odessa and just due south of St. Georges.  It is named for Captain Thomas Macdonough.

References

Unincorporated communities in New Castle County, Delaware
Unincorporated communities in Delaware